The German torpedo boat T31 was one of fifteen Type 39 torpedo boats built for the Kriegsmarine (German Navy) during World War II. Completed in early 1944, the boat was assigned to convoy escort duties and supporting German forces in the Baltic. She was sunk in combat with Soviet motor torpedo boats on 20 June off the Finnish coast on 20 June with 82 men killed.

Design and description
The Type 39 torpedo boat was conceived as a general-purpose design, much larger than preceding German torpedo boats. Their crew numbered 206 officers and sailors. The Type 39s were fitted with a pair of geared steam turbine sets, each driving one propeller, using steam from four high-pressure water-tube boilers.

As built, the Type 39 ships mounted four  SK C/32 guns in single mounts protected by gun shields; one forward of the superstructure, one between the funnels, and two aft, one superfiring over the other. Anti-aircraft defense was provided by four  SK C/30 AA guns in two twin-gun mounts on platforms abaft the rear funnel and a dozen  C/38 guns. One quadruple mount was positioned on the aft superstructure and two more were fitted on the bridge wings. They carried six above-water  torpedo tubes in two triple mounts amidships and could also carry 30 mines; the full complement of 60 mines made the ships top-heavy which could be dangerous in bad weather. For anti-submarine work the boats were fitted with a S-Gerät sonar and four depth charge launchers. The Type 39s were equipped with a FuMO 21 radar and various FumB radar detectors were installed late in the war.

Construction and career
T31 was ordered on 20 January 1941 from Schichau, laid down at their  Elbing, East Prussia, shipyard as yard number 1513, launched in 1943 and commissioned on 5 February 1944. After working up, T31 and her sister  were tasked to support Finnish forces in Vyborg Bay and Koivisto Sound during the Vyborg–Petrozavodsk Offensive.

Notes

Citations

References

External links
 T31 at german navy.de

Type 39 torpedo boats
1943 ships
Ships built by Schichau
Ships built in Elbing
Maritime incidents in June 1944
World War II shipwrecks in the Baltic Sea